The Great Indonesia Awakening Coalition, also known as the Great Indonesia Awakening, is an official political coalition in Indonesia which was formed through a political agreement between two parties from the Onward Indonesia Coalition, namely the Great Indonesia Movement Party and the National Awakening Party, in the face of the 2024 Indonesian presidential election.

Member parties

General election results

References 

Political party alliances in Indonesia
Political parties established in 2022